The 2013 Calgary municipal election was held Monday, October 21, 2013, to elect a mayor and 14 councillors to the city council, the seven trustees to the Calgary School District (each representing two of 14 wards), and five of the seven trustees to the Calgary Catholic School District (each representing two of 14 wards).

Two incumbent separate school trustees had no challengers.

From 1968 to 2013, provincial legislation required every municipality to hold elections every three years. The 28th Alberta Legislature introduced the Election Accountability Amendment Act (Bill 7) which among other reforms to provincial and municipal elections, amended the Local Authorities Election Act to extend the terms of local authorities including municipalities and school boards from three years to four years.

The 14 electoral wards were once again each represented by a single member on council, although the wards were changed slightly from the previous term. The neighbourhood of Martindale was moved from ward 3 to ward 5, and the community that expanded the neighbourhood of Cougar Ridge into ward 1 was with the rest of the neighbourhood in ward 6. This election also marked a change in title for council members, from "Alderman", to "Councillor".

Naheed K. Nenshi was elected mayor with  large majority of votes cast.

Candidates
Bold indicates elected, italics indicates incumbent.

Mayor

Larry Heather - Christian radio show host
Jon Lord - former PC MLA 
Alex Morozov
Naheed Nenshi - incumbent
Milan Papez Sr. - salesman
Norm Perrault
Carter Thomson - store owner

Ward 1

Chris Harper
Dan Larabie
John Hilton O'Brian
Ward Sutherland
Judi Vandenbrink

Ward 2

Bernie Dowhan - teacher
Joe Magliocca
Terry Wong
 Shawn Ripley - planning consultant

Ward 3

Jim Stevenson - incumbent

Ward 4

Sean Chu
Michael Hartford
Blair Houston
Gael MacLeod - incumbent

Ward 5

Ray Jones - incumbent

Ward 6

Robert Bowles
Richard Pootmans - incumbent

Ward 7

Brent Alexander - financial manager
Druh Farrell - incumbent
Joylin Nodwell
Kevin Taylor

Ward 8

John Mar - incumbent
Ian Newman - company manager
Evan Woolley

Ward 9

Gian-Carlo Carra - incumbent
Jordan Katz
Richard Wilkie

Ward 10

Andre Chabot - incumbent
Nargis Dossa

Ward 11

Wayne Frisch
James Maxim
Brian Pincott - incumbent

Ward 12

Shane Keating - incumbent

Ward 13

Diane Colley-Urquhart - incumbent
Adam Frisch
Scott Sorokoski

Ward 14

Peter Demong - incumbent
Shawn Kao

Public school trustees

Separate school trustees

Mayoral opinion polling

See also 
List of Calgary municipal elections
Calgary City Council

References

Further reading

External links
 The City of Calgary: Elections 2013

2013 Alberta municipal elections
2013
2010s in Calgary